Cam Nancarrow, born 9 April 1945 in Sydney, is a former squash player from Australia, who was one of the game's leading world players in the 1960s and 1970s.

State and national representative career
Nancarrow made the New South Wales men's team in the 1960s and he was a part of their legacy when between 1958 and 1973 members of that team won 78 consecutive matches at Australian carnivals.  Nancarrow, Ken Hiscoe, Ted Hamilton, Lionel Robberds and others participated in that time in the four men squad which eventually recorded a loss to Queensland in 1974. 

From 1967 till 1973 Nancarrow was named in every Australian National Men’s Team selected to compete at the World Men’s Team Championship governed by the World Squash Federation. Those sides were selected in 1967, 1969, 1971, 1973 and 1976 when he was named captain.

Individual accolades
Nancarrow won the World Amateur Individual Championship in 1973, having finished runner-up in that competition in 1967 and 1971. He was also runner-up at the British Open in 1969 and 1977. In March 2008, he was added to the Squash Australia Hall of Fame.

Personal
He is the step-father of 1980s and 1990s squash top player Tristan Nancarrow.

The name Nancarrow is of Cornish origin meaning "valley of the deer".

References 

Nancarrow, Cam
Australian people of Cornish descent
Living people
1945 births